Nana Otuo Siriboe is a Ghanaian traditional ruler, electrical engineer and entrepreneur. He is the Omanhene of the Juaben traditional area. He has served in several capacities in chieftaincy affairs and held many Government of Ghana appointments. He is currently the Chairman of the eighth Council of State of the Fourth Republic.

Early life and education 
Nana Otuo Siriboe II was born in the Ashanti Region of Ghana. He was admitted to study electrical engineering at the Kwame Nkrumah University of Science and Technology in the 1960s. He graduated in 1969 and after a brief stint as an engineer was installed as the paramount chief of the Juabeng traditional area.

Enstoolment and rule 
Nana Otu Siriboe II was installed as Paramount Chief of Juaben Traditional area in 1971. He has the official title of Juabenhene – Chief of Juaben. While serving as a traditional ruler, he has acquired vast experience in the fields of business, governance and chieftain affairs in the ensuing years after his instalment. Nana Siriboe II performs several assignments with and for the Asantehene and the Asante Kingdom. In February, 2017, he accompanied the Asantehene, Osei Tutu II, to Seychelles, where they met the President of Seychelles, James Michel.

Council of State 
During the John Agyekum Kufour administration, Nana Siriboe II was appointed to the council of state. He served two terms as a member of the council from 2001 to 2009. In February 2017 he was again appointed to the council by President Nana Akuffo-Addo. During the swearing-in ceremony held at The Flagstaff House,  President Akuffo-Addo entreated the council to advise him well with the view to always propel Ghana to greater heights. He was unanimously elected to chair all the activities of the twenty five member council. During the handing-over ceremony of the sixth session of the council to the seventh, the outgoing council chair, Naa Prof. John S. Nabila, advised the new house to give their best counsel to the new government to ensure that the country and all its citizens would live in prosperity and peace. Nana Siriboe's responsibilities as the chair of the council include meeting with Ghanaian of all political persuasions and professionals to listen to their concern and views so an unbiased conclusion can be attained during the council's deliberations. He regularly makes public statements which held to shape both government and private industry policies. Six months after becoming chair of the Council of State, Nana Otu Siriboe II, in an address enumerated some of the work the council had done. They included 36 meetings to discuss important issues concerning the country. Chief among the issues according to him were those that concerned the creation of new regions in the country.
On February 23, 2021, he was again re-elected and sworn in as the chairman of the eight Council of State by His excellency the president, Nana Akuffo-Addo.

Positions held 
Throughout his life as an electrical engineer and traditional ruler, Nana Siriboe II has held several positions in public life. The time frame for this has been over forty six years and they include:
 Member of Constituent Assembly of 1979
 Member of Ghana Broadcasting Corporation Board
 Komfo Anokye Teaching Hospital Board
 St. Louis Secondary School Board
 Chairman of the KNUST Council
 Member of Lands Commission
 Member of Ghana Prison Service Council
 Ghana Trade Fair Authority
 Director of Anglogold Ashanti
 Member Council of State
 Chairman Council of State

References 

Ghanaian leaders
Living people
People from Ashanti Region
Ghanaian engineers
Kwame Nkrumah University of Science and Technology alumni
Members of the Council of State (Ghana)
Ghanaian businesspeople
Ghanaian royalty
Year of birth missing (living people)
Alumni of Opoku Ware School